Neeraj Chawla (born 19 October 1979) is an Indian former cricketer. He played two List A matches for Delhi in 1999/00.

See also
 List of Delhi cricketers

References

External links
 

1979 births
Living people
Indian cricketers
Delhi cricketers
Cricketers from Delhi